Rupika Damayanthi De Silva is a Sri Lankan peace and women's rights activist. She is the founder of the non-governmental organization Saviya Development Foundation which supports peace building, and women and children's rights. She has worked to unify Sinhala women in the north part of the Philippines with Tamil women in the south. In 2004 De Silva worked to help women affected by the Indian Ocean earthquake and tsunami.

In 2012 De Silva was the recipient of the N-Peace Award as a role model for peace. She is a member of the Organization for Women in Science for the Developing World (OWSD).

References

External links
 Rupika de Silva wins the N-Peace Award 2012: Sri Lanka video

Living people
Year of birth missing (living people)
20th-century Sri Lankan women
21st-century Sri Lankan women
Sri Lankan women activists